Simi Valley (Chumash: Shimiyi) is a city in the valley of the same name in the southeast region of Ventura County, California, United States. The city sits next to Thousand Oaks, Moorpark, and Chatsworth. As of the 2020 U.S. Census the population was 126,356, up from 124,243 in 2010. The city of Simi Valley is surrounded by the Santa Susana Mountains and the Simi Hills, west of the San Fernando Valley, and northeast of the Conejo Valley. It grew as a commuter bedroom community for the cities in the Los Angeles area, and the San Fernando Valley when a freeway was built over the Santa Susana Pass.

The Ronald Reagan Presidential Library, where the former president was buried in 2004, is in Simi Valley. The Reagan Library has hosted Republican primary debates in 2012 and 2016.

History

Chumash/pre-colonial period 

Simi Valley was once inhabited by the Chumash people, who also settled much of the region from the Salinas Valley to the Santa Monica Mountains, with their presence dating back thousands of years. Around 5,000 years ago these tribes began processing acorns, and harvesting local marshland plants. Roughly 2,000 years later, as hunting and fishing techniques improved, the population increased significantly. Shortly after this sharp increase a precious stone money system arose, increasing the viability of the region by offsetting fluctuations in available resources relating to climate changes. The native people who inhabited Simi Valley spoke an interior dialect of the Chumash language, called Ventureño.

Simi Valley's name is derived from the Chumash word Shimiyi, which refers to the stringy, thread-like clouds that typify the region. The name could have originated from the strands of mist from coastal fog that move into the Oxnard Plain and wind their way up the Calleguas Creek and the Arroyo Las Posas into Simi Valley. The origin of the name was preserved because of the work of the anthropologist John P. Harrington, whose brother, Robert E. Harrington lived in Simi Valley. Robert Harrington later explained the name: "The word Simiji in Indian meant the little white wind clouds so often seen when the wind blows up here and Indians living on the coast, would never venture up here when those wind clouds were in the sky. The word Simiji was constructed by whites to the word Simi. There are other explanations about the name Simi, but this one was given to me by my brother who worked over 40 years for the Smithsonian Institution and it seems most plausible to me".

Three Chumash settlements existed in Simi Valley during the Mission period in the late 18th and early 19th century: Shimiyi, Ta’apu (present-day Tapo Canyon), and Kimishax or Quimicas (Happy Camp Canyon west of Moorpark College). There are many Chumash cave paintings in the area containing pictographs, including the Burro Flats Painted Cave in the Burro Flats area of the Simi Hills, located between the Simi Valley, West Hills, and Bell Canyon. The cave is located on private land owned by NASA. Other areas containing Chumash Native American pictographs in the Simi Hills are by Lake Manor and Chatsworth.

The Rancho period 

The first Europeans to visit Simi Valley were members of the Spanish Portolá expedition (1769–1770), the first European land entry and exploration of the present-day state of California. The expedition traversed the valley on January 13–14, 1770, traveling from Conejo Valley to San Fernando Valley. They camped near a native village in the valley on the 14th.

Rancho Simí, also known as Rancho San José de Nuestra Señora de Altagracia y Simí, was a   Spanish land grant in eastern Ventura and western Los Angeles counties granted in 1795 to Santiago Pico.  After Santiago Pico's death in 1815, the Rancho was regranted to Santiago's sons Javier Pico and his two brothers, Patricio Pico and Miguel Pico, members of the prominent Pico family of California. Rancho Simí was the earliest Spanish colonial land grant within Ventura and Santa Barbara Counties. The name derives from Shimiji, the name of the Chumash Native American village here before the Spanish. It was the largest Spanish or Mexican land grant given in Ventura County, and one of the largest given in California. The Simi Adobe-Strathearn House, later the home of Robert P. Strathearn and family, served as the headquarters of the rancho.

José de la Guerra y Noriega, a Captain of the Santa Barbara Presidio, who had begun to acquire large amounts of land in California to raise cattle, purchased Rancho Simí from the Pico family in 1842.  After Jose de la Guerra death in 1858, the sons of Jose de la Guerra continued to operate the ranchos.  The end of their prosperity came when several years of drought in the 1860s caused heavy losses.  In 1865, the De la Guerras lost the ownership of El Rancho Simí excluding the Rancho Tapo.  El Rancho Tapo was part of the original 113,009-acre Rancho Simí grant, but sometime around 1820–1830, the Rancho Tapo came to be thought of as a separate place within Rancho Simí. The last of the De la Guerras to live in Simí Valley retreated to a 14,400-acre portion of the original rancho that was known as the Tapo Rancho.  As late as February 1877, Juan De la Guerra was reported in county newspapers to be preparing to plant walnuts in the Tapo, which appears to be the final mention of their farming in relation to the original Simí grant.

The De la Guerra heirs tried every legal means, but by the 1880s, the Rancho Tapo also slipped from their ownership, as had the rest of the Rancho.

The Pioneer period 
The Pioneer, or 'American,’ period in Simi Valley began with the 96,000-acre purchase of El Rancho Simí by an eastern speculator named Thomas A. Scott (1814–1882), who had made his money as an investor in the Pennsylvania Railroad during the Civil War. He was president of the Pennsylvania Railroad, and a partner in Philadelphia and California Petroleum Company.  Scouts came to California to purchase lands, and thus Scott acquired El Rancho Simí (1865). His goal was to locate sites for oil, since the first oil well had been developed in Titusville, Pennsylvania just a few years earlier (1859).  Within a short time, a 27-year-old man named Thomas Bard was sent west by Scott to manage the California properties.  In the late 1880s, Simí Land and Water Company was formed to see to the selling of the huge rancho in ranch-size properties. Some American farmers had begun to lease land in the greater Rancho Simí for farming.

The earliest Anglo American ranchers showed up in Simí Valley in the late 1860s into the 1870s. Charles Emerson Hoar was given the title of "first American farmer" by early Simí historian Janet Scott Cameron. He had purchased the Hummingbird's Nest Ranch in the northeast corner of the Valley, and he leased land from the new owners of the Simí Rancho for raising sheep, already a proven way of making a living.

Much of the Simí Rancho land continued, as in Spanish days, to be used for raising sheep, cattle and grain. Wheat prospered longer here than in the rest of the county because it was free of a disease called "rust". Barley soon became the really successful grain crop.

Agriculture and ranching dominated the landscape through the 1950s.  Citrus, walnuts and apricots were all grown in Simi Valley.  In the early 1960s modern residential development began to take place.

Modern residential development 
When Simí was an agricultural community, there were ranch houses that dotted the Valley.  Four distinct communities also were located in the Valley (see 'Four Communities of Simi Valley' section below) prior to modern residential development.  Though 1957 and 1958 brought the first 'tract' housing developments when the Dennis and Ayhens, Wright Ranch and Valley Vista tracts were built, the tremendous 'boom' in residential development took place beginning in 1960.  The population which was 4,073 in 1950 doubled to 8,110 in 1960. By 1970 the population in Simi is reported by the census as 59,832.

Four communities of Simi Valley prior to modern residential development 
The pioneers arrived in the late 1860s – 1870s and ever since, this has been 'The Valley of Simi.'  But, not all the communities in the valley were known as 'Simi.'  There was the township of Simi (known as 'Simiopolis' for about a six-month period in 1888, but then the name reverted to Simi).  In the valley there were also the communities of Santa Susana, Community Center and the Susana Knolls (known first as Mortimer Park) at different points in time.

Simi – In the late 1887–1888, the incorporation of Simi Land and Water Company came about.  El Rancho Simí was divided into ranches and farms by that corporation, and advertised for sale to midwestern and New England states.  An investor group, the California Mutual Benefit Colony of Chicago, purchased land and laid out a townsite (located between First and Fifth Streets and from Los Angeles south to Ventura Ave), named it 'Simiopolis' and shipped twelve pre-cut, partially assembled houses from a lumberyard in Chicago via rail to Saticoy, then brought by wagon to Simi. These are known as 'colony houses.' This was the first 'neighborhood' in Simi. Stores sprung up on Los Angeles Ave, and the first Simi School was built in 1890 on Third and California Streets, and was used until Simi Elementary was built in the mid-1920s.

Santa Susana – In 1903 the Santa Susana Train Depot was built, and the railroad was complete through Simi Valley, except for the tunnel, which was completed in 1904.  A small business community grew up near the Santa Susana Train Depot, which was located on the north side of Los Angeles Ave, just east of Tapo Street. Over time residential developments followed and the town of Santa Susana was born. The Depot was moved in 1975 by Rancho Simi Recreation and Park District to its current location off of Kuehner.

Community Center – In 1922 L.F. Roussey laid out the small development which became known as Community Center. The driving force behind this development was the need for a High School in Simi Valley, as well as an elementary school in a more central location in the valley. The FIRST graduating class from the very first Simi High School was 1924, Simi Elementary was completed in 1926, The Methodist Church (which is now the Cultural Arts Center) was built in 1924.  Numerous houses were built in Community Center in the 1920s and 1930s. The Simi Valley Woman's Club was located there as well (the building which served as the clubhouse for the Woman's Club was moved from the town of Simi).  The Woman's Club club house was used by many individuals and organizations as a community meeting place. It truly was a 'community center.'

Mortimer Park (the Susana knolls) – The area that is now the Knolls was a nearly 1,800-acre parcel of land that was purchased by Mr. and Mrs. Lewis T. Mortimer in the early 1920s. They planned on selling the lots for cabins, or vacation homes.  The lots, however, were very small (30 x 50 feet), and the Mortimers did not take the mountainous nature of the land into account, so quite often the lots were not buildable. Oftentimes several lots were needed to build structures.  In 1944 the Garden Club, an active community organization in the area petitioned the county supervisors to change the name of Mortimer Park to the Susana Knolls.

The first attempt to incorporate the towns of Simi, the area known as Community Center (93065) and Santa Susana (93063) in 1966 was unsuccessful.  The second attempt in 1969 was successful, with residents voting 6,454 to 3,685 in favor of incorporation.  59% of eligible voters turned out for this vote.  Susana Knolls is an unincorporated area of the Valley. Voters also voted whether to call this newly incorporated city 'Santa Susana' or 'Simi Valley.' The name Simi Valley garnered 2,000 more votes than Santa Susana.

Other items of historical interest

Santa Susana Field Laboratory

The  Santa Susana Field Laboratory located in the Simi Hills, was used for the development of pioneering nuclear reactors and rocket engines beginning in 1948. The site was operated by Atomics International and Rocketdyne (originally both divisions of the North American Aviation company). The Rocketdyne division developed a variety of liquid rocket engines. Rocket engine tests were frequently heard in Simi Valley. The Atomics International division of North American Aviation designed, built and operated the Sodium Reactor Experiment, which in 1957 became the first United States commercial nuclear reactor to supply electricity to a public power system., when it powered the city of Moorpark (the government owned BORAX-III reactor had previously powered Arco, Idaho for around an hour in 1955). The last nuclear reactor operated at SSFL in 1980 and the last rocket engine was produced in 2006. The SSFL has been closed to development and testing. The site is undergoing investigation and removal of the nuclear facilities and cleanup of the soil and groundwater. The Boeing Company, the US DOE, and NASA are responsible for the cleanup.

In July 1959, the Sodium Reactor Experiment suffered a serious incident when 13 of the reactor's 43 fuel elements partially melted resulting in the controlled release of radioactive gas to the atmosphere. The reactor was repaired and returned to operation in September, 1960. The incident at the Sodium Reactor Experiment has been a source of controversy in the community. Technical analysis of the incident intended to support a lawsuit against the current landowner (The Boeing Company) asserts the incident caused the much greater release of radioactivity than the accident at Three Mile Island. Boeing's technical response concludes the monitoring conducted at the time of the incident, shows only the allowable amount of radioactive gasses were released, and a Three Mile Island-scale release was not possible. The case was settled, it is reported, with a large payment by Boeing. In September 2009, The U.S. Department of Energy sponsored a public workshop where three nuclear reactor experts shared their independent analysis of the July, 1959 incident.

The Santa Susana Field Laboratory also hosted the Energy Technology Engineering Center. The center performed the design, development and testing of liquid metal reactor components for the United States Department of Energy from 1965 until 1998.

The Santa Susana Field Laboratory includes sites identified as historic by the American Institute of Aeronautics and Astronautics and by the American Nuclear Society. The National Register of Historic Places listed Burro Flats Painted Cave is located within the Santa Susana Field Laboratory, on a portion of the site owned by the U.S. Government. The drawings within the cave have been termed "the best preserved Indian pictograph in Southern California".

Rodney King trial

Four officers of the Los Angeles Police Department (Stacey Koon, Laurence Powell, Timothy Wind, and Theodore Briseno) were accused of using unnecessary force in a March 3, 1991 beating of an African-American motorist Rodney Glen King. The case known as the Rodney King Trials was based on footage recorded on home video by a bystander (George Holliday). The now-infamous video was broadcast nationally and globally and caused tremendous response because the beating was believed to be racially motivated. Due to the heavy media coverage of the arrest, Judge Stanley Weisberg of the California Court of Appeals approved a change of venue to neighboring Ventura County, using an available courtroom in Simi Valley for the state case against the officers.

On April 29, 1992, a Ventura County jury acquitted three of the four officers (Koon, Wind, and Briseno) and did not reach a verdict on one (Powell). Many believed that the unexpected outcome was a result of the racial and social make-up of the jury, which included ten white people, one Filipino person, and one Hispanic woman. None were Simi Valley residents.  Among the jury were three who had been security guards or in military service. The acquittal led to the 1992 Los Angeles riots and mass protest around the country.

Geography

Simi Valley is a city located in the very southeast corner of Ventura County, bordering the San Fernando Valley in Los Angeles County, and is a part of the Greater Los Angeles Area. The city of Simi Valley basically consists of the eponymous valley itself. The city of Simi Valley borders the Santa Susana Mountains to the north, the Simi Hills to the east and south, and is adjacent to Thousand Oaks to the southwest and Moorpark to the west. Simi Valley is connected to the nearby San Fernando Valley by the Santa Susana Pass in the extreme east of Simi Valley. Simi Valley is located at 34°16'16" North, 118°44'22" West (34.271078, −118.739428) with an elevation of 700–1,000 ft (210–300 m) above sea level. The syncline Simi Valley is located in the western part of the region called the Transverse Ranges. The valley is surrounded by the Santa Susana Mountains to the north and Simi Hills to the east and south. While the Santa Susana Mountains separate the valley from the Los Padres National Forest in the north, the Simi Hills separate it from Conejo Valley in the south. In the extreme east is Rocky Peak, one of Santa Susana Mountains' highest peaks, which is a dividing line between Ventura County to the west and Los Angeles County to the east. On the other side of the valley, in the extreme west side of Simi Valley is Mount McCoy, which may be most known for its 12 ft. concrete cross that sits at its peak. The physiographical valley is a structural as well as a topographic depression. The Simi Valley, just as neighboring San Fernando Valley, owes its existence and shape to the faulting and folding of the rocks. It is essentially a structural valley and not wholly the work of erosion. It is drained by the Calleguas Creek and also its principal tributary, Conejo Creek. Both of these originate in the Santa Susana Mountains.

According to the United States Census Bureau, the city has a total area of 42.2 sq mi (109.4 km2), comprising 41.5 sq mi (107.4 km2) of land and 0.77 sq mi (2.0 km2), or 1.81%, of it is water. Commutes to Los Angeles are usually via the Ronald Reagan Freeway (Highway 118) or the Southern California Metrolink commuter train, which makes several daily trips from Simi Valley. Simi Valley has a mediterranean climate. Temperate variations between day and night tend to be relatively big. The precipitation remains less than one inch for seven months – April until October, – while the precipitation exceeds four inches in the two wettest months – January and February. While the mean temperature is at its lowest at 53.6 degrees in December, the mean temperature in July and August exceeds 76 degrees.

Simi Valley has been the victim of several natural disasters, including the flood of 1967, the storm of 1983, the 1988 lightning strike, as well as the 1994 Northridge earthquake and numerous wildfires.

Climate

Simi Valley has a warm and dry climate during summer when mean temperatures tend to be in the 70s. Wildfires do also occur here. The city's climate cools during winter when mean temperatures tend to be in the 50s. Because of its relatively low elevation, the Simi Hills typically experience rainy, mild winters. Snow is rare in the Simi Hills, even in the highest areas. The annual average precipitation in Simi Valley is 17.9 inches. Winter months tend to be wetter than summer months. The wettest month of the year is February with an average rainfall of 4.8 inches. Simi Valley gets 18 inches of rain per year, while the United States average is 37. Snowfall is 0 inches, while the U.S. average is 25 inches of snow per year. The number of days with measurable precipitation is 25. On average, there are 277 sunny days in Simi Valley per year.

Natural hazards

An aspect of Simi Valley's location, situated beside the Simi Hills, is that it lies in a high-risk area for the wildfires that sweep through Southern California's mountain ranges every few years. Simi Valley is also at risk for earthquakes. The valley is surrounded by faults; the closest ones being the Santa Rosa Fault to the Northwest, the Northridge Hills Fault to the Northeast, and the Chatsworth Fault to the South. In 1994, portions of Simi Valley received significant damage from the Northridge earthquake. See Nuclear Accident at SSFL for information on the accident and associated risk(s) to residents.

Wildfires

In autumn 2003, the Simi Fire burned about 108,000 acres.  A 2005 fire started on September 28 and burned an estimated . On September 29, the fire was estimated to be . More than 1,000 firefighters worked against the tricky combination of dry brush, low humidity and temperatures in the high 90s along the line that divides Los Angeles and Ventura counties. The fire was later brought under control and extinguished, without serious injury. Three homes were lost in outlying areas, but none within the city limits.

Demographics

Before the 1960s, Simi Valley once boasted a strong community of Latino families, many of whom worked for white ranchers. However, the housing boom in the 1960s and 1970s attracted many white Americans leaving urban areas in Los Angeles and the San Fernando Valley. This turned Simi Valley into a predominately white city, but the percentage of those who identified as non-Hispanic white began to decrease from 86.2% in 1980 to 54% in 2020.

2010

The 2010 United States Census reported that Simi Valley had a population of 124,237. The racial makeup of Simi Valley was 93,597 (75.3%) White, 1,739 (1.4%) African American, 761 (0.6%) Native American, 11,555 (9.3%) Asian, 178 (0.1%) Pacific Islander, 10,685 (8.6%) from other races, and 5,722 (4.6%) from two or more races. Hispanic or Latino of any race were 10,938 persons (23.3%); 16.2% of Simi Valley's population were Mexican-American, 1.2% Salvadoran, 0.9% Guatemalan, 0.6% Puerto Rican, 0.6% Peruvian, 0.3% Cuban, 0.3% Argentine, 0.2% Honduran, 0.2% Nicaraguan, and 0.2% Ecuadorian. Among Asian-Americans, 2.7% of Simi Valley's population were Indian-Americans, 2.2% Filipino, 1.2% Chinese, 1.0% Vietnamese, 0.7% Korean, 0.5% Japanese, 0.2% Thai, 0.1% Pakistani. The majority of Simi Valley's population was made up of Caucasian-Americans; the largest groups of whites were 16.7% German-American, 11.3% English, 8.5% Italian, 3.4% French, 3.1% Polish, 2.3% Norwegian, 2.3% Swedish, 2.1% Scottish and 2% Dutch.

The Census reported that 123,577 people (99.5% of the population) lived in households, 482 (0.4%) lived in non-institutionalized group quarters, and 178 (0.1%) were institutionalized. There were 41,237 households, out of which 16,765 (40.7%) had children under the age of 18 living in them, 24,824 (60.2%) were opposite-sex married couples living together, 4,659 (11.3%) had a female householder with no husband present, 2,214 (5.4%) had a male householder with no wife present.  There were 1,975 (4.8%) unmarried opposite-sex partnerships, and 291 (0.7%) same-sex married couples or partnerships. 7,087 households (17.2%) were made up of individuals, and 3,013 (7.3%) had someone living alone who was 65 years of age or older. The average household size was 3.00. There were 31,697 families (76.9% of all households); the average family size was 3.33.

The population was spread out, with 31,036 people (25.0%) under the age of 18, 11,088 people (8.9%) aged 18 to 24, 33,890 people (27.3%) aged 25 to 44, 35,046 people (28.2%) aged 45 to 64, and 13,177 people (10.6%) who were 65 years of age or older. The median age was 37.8 years. For every 100 females, there were 96.6 males. For every 100 females age 18 and over, there were 94.4 males. The homeowner vacancy rate was 1.2%; the rental vacancy rate was 4.6%. 93,181 people (75.0% of the population) lived in owner-occupied housing units and 30,396 people (24.5%) lived in rental housing units.

2000

As of the 2000 United States census, there were 111,351 people, 36,421 households, and 28,954 families 
residing in the city.  The population density was 1,097.3/km² 
(2,841.9/mi²). There were 37,272 housing units at an average density of 
367.3/km² (951.3/mi²). The racial makeup of the city was 
81.33% White, 1.26% Black or African American, 0.70% Native American, 6.33% Asian, 0.14% 
Pacific Islander, 6.50% from other races, and 3.74% from two or more races.  16.82% of the population were Hispanic or Latino of any race.

There were 36,421 households, out of which 42.5% had children under the age of 18 living with them, 63.9% were married couples living together, 10.7% had a female householder with no husband present, and 20.5% were non-families. 14.7% of all households were made up of individuals, and 4.9% had someone living alone who was 65 years of age or older. The average household size was 3.04 and the average family size was 3.33.

In the city, the population was spread out, with 28.4% under the age of 18, 7.9% from 18 to 24, 32.9% from 25 to 44, 23.1% from 45 to 64, and 7.6% who were 65 years of age or older. The median age was 35 years.  For every 100 females, there were 97.9 males. For every 100 females age 18 and over, there were 95.6 males.

Income

According to a 2007 estimate, the median income for a household in the city was $88,406, and the median income for a family was $91,658. 10.2% of the population and 7.4% of families were below the poverty line. In 2016, the median income for a household in Simi Valley has increased to $90,210 according to the U.S. Census Bureau. The median per capita income for the past 12 months (2015) was $37,459. Sales tax was at 7.25% and income taxes were at 8.00%. The current unemployment rate was at 4.80% with a 0.36% recent job growth compared to the National Unemployment Rate of 5.20% and a 1.59% job growth. The median cost of homes in Simi Valley was $450,500 with mortgages at a median of $2,456.

Politics

Simi Valley is considered a conservative stronghold politically, along with the neighboring city of Thousand Oaks. The electorate was, at one point in time, often described as solidly Republican. Numerous publications had indicated Simi Valley among the most conservative cities in the United States; Simi Valley was ranked the 18th most conservative city in the country in 2005 by GovPro.com. Since its incorporation as a city, Simi Valley had voted for every Republican presidential nominee until 2020 when Joe Biden became the first Democrat to win the once-conservative stronghold.

Republican Keith Mashburn has been the incumbent mayor since 2018.

The former Republican president and California governor, Ronald Reagan, is buried at the Ronald Reagan Presidential Library on a hilltop by the Thousand Oaks-Simi Valley city limits. The presidential library is frequently visited by conservative speakers and has been hosting numerous Republican primary debates, including the first debate in the 2008 presidential election, the 2012 presidential election, and the second primary debate for the 2016 presidential election. Simi Valley is located within the 25th congressional district, represented by Mike Garcia. The Simi Valley as well as neighboring Chatsworth are among the most Republican communities in the Greater Los Angeles Area, and the 25th district is among the most conservative in the State of California. In November 2018, Katie Hill unseated Republican Steve Knight and became the first Democratic woman to represent the district in the House of Representatives. Less than a year later, she would resign after revelations of an affair with a congressional staffer. She was replaced in a special election with Republican Mike Garcia.

Local government

Simi Valley's government uses the "Council-Manager" form of government. This means that the city council is composed of one mayor, elected every two years, and four council members elected for four-year terms.  The city council appoints both the city attorney and city manager, who heads the executive branch of the city government.  The city manager appoints the various department heads for the city, and acts as the city clerk and city treasurer.

According to the 2008–2009 Comprehensive Annual Financial Report Fund Financial Statements, the city's various funds had $89.3 million in Revenues, $86.3 million in expenditures, $139.9 million in total assets, $26.1 million in total liabilities, and $158.5 million in investments.

The structure of the management and coordination of city services is:

State and federal representation

Landmarks

Simi Valley is home to the Ronald Reagan Presidential Library, which has been visited by almost 400.000 people in 2014. After a major state funeral in Washington, D.C., President Reagan was buried at the library in June 2004.  The library adjoins a hangar in which the Boeing 707 SAM 27000 (Air Force One), which served presidents Nixon through G.W. Bush, is housed and available for tours.  In the pavilion are various automobiles used to transport the president, as well as Marine One, the presidential helicopter.

Infrastructure

The Montalvo Cutoff, a railroad line opened by the Southern Pacific Railroad on March 20, 1904, to improve the alignment of its Coast Line, runs east–west through the valley. In 1905, the longest train tunnel in the United States at that time was completed at the east end of Simi Valley. Tunnel #26 still stands today linking Simi Valley and the San Fernando Valley. The area was originally served by the Santa Susana Depot which was also opened in 1904 as a combination passenger and freight depot built by the Southern Pacific and located on Los Angeles Avenue near Tapo Street.  The station remained in use for the following 60 years until changes in the business model for railroads evolved that rendered the depot useless to the railroad.

Simi Valley Station is used by Amtrak and Metrolink on the railroad's Ventura County Line, after the line was purchased from Southern Pacific. The station is located at 5050 Los Angeles Avenue, west of Stearns Street. Simi Valley Transit buses stop on Los Angeles Avenue in front of the station. There are connections from Simi Valley north to Santa Barbara and San Luis Obispo, and south to Los Angeles, Orange, and San Diego Counties.
These trains, as well as the buses, run 7 days a week and stop in Simi Valley several times each day. The Simi Valley station is unstaffed; however, tickets are available from automated ticket dispensers, conductors on board the trains, travel agents, by telephone, or from the Amtrak and Metrolink websites.

The United States Postal Service operates the Simi Valley Post Office at 2511 Galena Avenue, the Kopy King Post Office at 2157 Tapo Street, and the Mount McCoy Post Office at 225 Simi Village Drive.

The city operates its own police department, and contracts with the Ventura County Fire Department to provide fire protection services.  There are six fire stations within Simi Valley, and the city recently built a state-of-the-art police station. American Medical Response, in conjunction with Ventura County Fire Department, provide Emergency Medical Services at the Advanced Life Support (ALS) level.

The city provides sanitation service to residences, businesses and other users. Underground sewer lines collect sewage and wastewater which is treated at the city's sewage plant.

Transportation

Rail 
Simi Valley Station is used by Amtrak and Metrolink on the railroad's Ventura County Line, after the line was purchased from Southern Pacific. The station is located at 5050 Los Angeles Avenue, west of Stearns Street. Simi Valley Transit buses stop on Los Angeles Avenue in front of the station. There are connections from Simi Valley north to Santa Barbara and San Luis Obispo, and south to Los Angeles, Orange, and San Diego Counties.
These trains, as well as the buses, run 7 days a week and stop in Simi Valley several times each day. The Simi Valley station is unstaffed; however, tickets are available from automated ticket dispensers, conductors on board the trains, travel agents, by telephone, or from the Amtrak and Metrolink websites.

Economy

Commuting into the city of Los Angeles for work is done by 27% of Simi Valley residents, with 20% working within Simi Valley.

In Simi Valley there are two main areas of industry – one in the eastern part of the city and the other one in the west. The primary industry is machinery and tools with 69 firms, and the secondary is the metal industry with 51 firms, both situated in the eastern and western industrial areas. Other industries such as lumber/wood products, food, plastic products, apparel/textiles and minerals, are also concentrated largely in these industrial areas.

The largest division of Countrywide Home Loans, now Bank of America, Loan Administration, has been headquartered in the city since the mid-1990s. Operating from Madera Road in a building that once housed the apparel company Bugle Boy, the company also has facilities on Tapo Canyon Road, and First Street. At its height, Countrywide had approximately 10,000 employees in the city.

The Volkswagen of America Design Center was once in an industrial complex across from the Costco wholesale club near Madera and Cochran.  The VW Design Center California or DCC, moved to Santa Monica, California in the spring of 2006.  Such notable automotive designers as Jay Mays, now (2007) VP Design for Ford and Freeman Thomas, co designer with Jay Mays of the original Audi TT, once called the DCC in Simi Valley their place of work.  The original concept for the New Beetle from Jay Mays, had its genesis there.

Comparing to other cities in USA Simi Valley citizens are somewhat rich with a per capita income of $170,712 for a family of four per year.

Top employers

According to the city's 2019-20 Comprehensive Annual Financial Report, the top employers in the city are:

Education

Simi Valley is served by the Simi Valley Unified School District (SVUSD).

Santa Susana High School has been named as a silver medal winner in U.S. News & World Report's "Top 500 Schools in America" for 2013 and 2014.

Simi Valley High School was ranked among MSNBC's Top 1,000 High Schools in the country.

Schools of higher education located nearby include Moorpark College, Cal State Northridge, Cal State Channel Islands, California Lutheran University, University of LaVerne, University of California Santa Barbara (UCSB), Ventura College, Oxnard College, Eternity Bible College, Louis Brandeis Institute of Justice, Pepperdine University, University of Southern California (USC), Caltech, Valley College, American Jewish University, Loyola Marymount University, University of La Verne, and UCLA.

There are five high schools located in Simi Valley: Royal High School, Grace Brethren High School, Santa Susana High School, Simi Valley High School, and Apollo High School (a continuation school).

There are three middle schools located in Simi Valley: Hillside Middle School, Valley View Middle School, and Sinaloa Middle School.

Simi Valley also has an adult school (Simi Adult School) and a cosmetology school.

Libraries

The Simi Valley Public Library, operated by the City of Simi Valley, opened in July 2013. Services were formerly provided through the Ventura County Library system. In its first year operating as a municipal library, it welcomed over 200,000 patrons into the library.

Recreation

Park facilities in Simi Valley are operated by the Rancho Simi Recreation and Park District. This included a total of fifty parks, where some are urban city-parks, while others are public open space or multi-purpose trail systems. The purpose of these areas are to preserve the native landscape, as well as function as a wildlife corridor that protects the natural habitat for wildlife and flora. The city also boasts six golf courses and the Kanan Ranch home development has nature trails for hikers, bicyclists and equestrians to enjoy. Two collegiate baseball teams: The Simi Valley Senators and the California Oaks of the California Collegiate League in Thousand Oaks, provide sports action to local fans.

To the east, Rocky Peak has a trail system for Mountain Biking, Hiking and Equestrian activities.  The trail is accessed just off the 118 freeway at Kuehner Road, Yosemite Road (about  North) or Rocky Peak. Trailheads are: The Hummingbird Trail, Rocky Peak Fire Road or The Chumash Trail. These trails are not recommended for beginners, due to fairly steep grades and some technical sections on the trail.

To the southwest, numerous trails are accessible for Mountain Biking, Hiking and Equestrian activities.  The main access point for Wood Ranch Open Space is at the intersection of Wood Ranch Parkway and Long Canyon Parkway, but can also be accessed through nearby Challenger Park or from trailheads in Thousand Oaks.  The trail system travels as far west as highway 23, as far east as the Rocketdyne facility and connects to the Lang Ranch trail system (Westlake Village) and Chesebro trail system, which begins in Agoura Hills. Simi Peak (the highest peak in Simi Valley) is accessible from this trail system via China Flats in the Chesebro trail system. Ahmundson Ranch connects to this trail system, again via the Chesebro trail system.  Bridlepath, a private trail system also connects to the main fire road. The west end of Simi Valley is also home to the 150-acre Tierra Rejada Park, which offers hiking trails to nearby Moorpark.

List of public-owned parks in Simi Valley:

 Arroyo Park
 Arroyo Simi Trail
 Arroyostow Park
 Atherwood Park
 Berylwood Park
 Big Sky Park
 Challenger Park (area connects to Thousand Oaks and Westlake Village, with trail outlets in these cities as well)
 Chumash Park
 Citrus Grove Park
 Corriganville Park
 Coyote Hills Park
 Darrah Park
 Foothill Park
 Frontier Park
 Houghton-Schreiber Park
 Indian Hills Open Space
 Knolls Park
 Las Llajas Canyon (connects to Chatsworth, Los Angeles)
 Lincoln Park
 Marr Ranch Open Space
 Mayfair Park
 Mount McCoy
 Mount Sinai
 Oak Park
 Old Windmill Park
 Parker Ranch Open Space
 Rancho Madera Park
 Rancho Santa Susana Community Park
 Rancho Simi Community Park
 Rancho Tapo Community Park
 Rocky Peak Park (connects to Chatsworth, Los Angeles)
 Sage Ranch Park (adjacent to West Hills, Los Angeles)
 Sand Canyon Open Space
 Santa Susana Park & Historic Railroad Depot
 Sequoia Park
 Simi Hills Park
 Simi Peak (highest point in Simi Valley)
 Sinaloa Park
 Stargaze Park
 Strathearn Historical Park and Museum
 Sycamore Canyon Park
 Sycamore Park
 Tapo Canyon Regional Park
 Tierra Rejada Park (connects to Moorpark)
 Verde Park
 Vista Del Arroyo Park
 Willowbrook Park
 Wood Ranch Open Space (connects to Thousand Oaks)

Wildlife

The Simi Hills are the most critical wildlife corridor linkage from the Santa Monica Mountains – to the Santa Susana Mountains, and beyond to the Topatopa Mountains, San Gabriel Mountains, and other Transverse Ranges further east. The Simi's undeveloped native habitat provides routes that protect larger land wildlife of the Santa Monicas from genetic isolation. Large sections of the Simi Hills are protected by parks and open space preserves. Animals in the area include mammals such as the Virginia opossum, ornate shrew, broad-footed mole, mountain lion, mule deer, bobcat, spotted and striped skunk, California badger, southern California weasel, California raccoon, ringtail cat, black bear, Botta's pocket gopher, desert cottontail, valley coyote, gray fox, California vole, brush rabbit, California ground- and California grey squirrel, as well as several species of mice (California pocket mouse, western harvest mouse, brush mouse, deer mouse, and house mouse), rats (agile kangaroo rat, dusky-footed woodrat, black rat, roof rat, and brown rat) and bats (long-eared myotis, long-legged myotis, California myotis, small-footed myotis, western pipistrelle, Brazilian free-tailed bat, western mastiff bat, and Tejon myotis). Some of the reptiles in the area include several species of snakes (coachwhip, southern Pacific rattlesnake, San Diego night snake, striped racer, California black-headed snake, two-striped garter snake, San Diego gopher snake, coast mountain kingsnake, California kingsnake, coast patch-nosed snake, ringneck snake) and lizards (western fence lizard, California side blotched lizard, western skink, western whiptail, San Diego horned lizard, California horned lizard, San Diego alligator lizard, silvery legless lizard). There are ten species of amphibians in Simi Valley: the California newt, western spadefoot, California toad, arroyo toad, California slender salamander, arboreal salamander, American bullfrog, California red-legged frog, California treefrog, and the Pacific treefrog.

Birds in Simi Valley include Anna's hummingbird, Canada goose, mallard, California quail, common egret, great blue heron, American bittern, American coot, killdeer, mourning dove, roadrunner, belted kingfisher, black phoebe, barn swallow, cliff swallow, common raven, crow, white-breasted nuthatch, cactus wren, mockingbird, robin, cedar waxwing, phainopepla, starling, least Bell's vireo, hooded oriole, western tanager, several species of blackbird (western meadowlark, Brewer's blackbird and brown-headed cowbird) and woodpeckers (common flicker, Nuttall's woodpecker, acorn woodpecker, and yellow-bellied sapsucker). Raptors include turkey vulture, white-tailed kite, American kestrel, poor-will and several species of hawks (Cooper's hawk, sharp-shinned hawk, marsh hawk, red-tailed hawk, red-shouldered hawk, and the common nighthawk) and owls (great horned owl, short-eared owl, long-eared owl, barn owl, and the burrowing owl). Grosbeaks, finches and sparrows include black-headed grosbeak, house finch, American goldfinch, lesser goldfinch, California towhee, Savannah sparrow, sage sparrow, dark-eyed junco, white-crowned sparrow and the house sparrow.

In popular culture

Given its close proximity to Hollywood, Simi Valley has long been a popular entertainment industry location.
Simi Valley and the surrounding hills have been the site of several television shows, including the long-running series Gunsmoke and M*A*S*H.
 Established in 1937 and opened to the public in 1949, the Corriganville Movie Ranch, established by Ray "Crash" Corrigan, is located at the extreme Eastern end of Simi Valley and was the production site for many movies and television shows.  Today the site is open to the public as Corriganville Park, just off the Santa Susana Pass Road.
 The popular 1970s television show Little House on the Prairie utilized an expansive collection of sets constructed throughout the hilly landscapes of Big Sky Ranch in the Tapo Canyon hills north of Simi Valley and Santa Clarita, California. In addition to the Little House itself, the entire set for the town of Walnut Grove was built atop the hills. After finishing his work on the series, Michael Landon blew up the town (which became part of the final movie) but the Little House itself was left intact.  In July 2004, the house was destroyed by a devastating California wildfire.
 The 1973 film The Doberman Gang was filmed entirely in Simi Valley, with the actual Bank of A. Levy as the backdrop for the robbery scenes.
 In 1983, Colleen McCullough's TV mini-series The Thorn Birds was brought to life in a remote corner of the Simi Valley. Australia presented too many hurdles for producers, the least of which was the restriction that only two American actors star in any movie filmed there; the rest had to be Australian. Location scouts went scouring, and Simi Valley, some of which strongly resembles parts of the Australian countryside, was chosen for the famous Cleary ranch and sheep station, Drogheda.
 In the 1984 film Bachelor Party starring Tom Hanks, the MANN 6 Movie Theater, formerly located within the Sycamore Shopping Center, was used for the movie theater scene.
 The 1986 western comedy film Three Amigos was partially filmed here.
 The Brandeis-Bardin Institute's House of the Book is the location of the original Power Ranger Power Chamber.
 The 1982 hit horror film Poltergeist was filmed on Roxbury Street in Simi Valley. At the time, the homes were new and the land behind the street was free, allowing plenty of access for studio trucks.  4267 Roxbury Street (the Freeling house in the film) suffered substantial earthquake damage in the 1994 Northridge earthquake.
 For the 1992 movie Sneakers with Robert Redford, the Gibraltar Savings building (later Countrywide at 400 Countrywide Way) was transformed to The Playtronics Toy company. The entire front lobby and hallways were redone for the movie and then returned to their original design. Some of the filmings were done from hills across from the building. Many scenes were shot at night with the permission of the residents, due to the lighting required.
 The delivery of the ransom money in The Big Lebowski shows a highway sign naming Simi Valley.
 The video for Bullet with Butterfly Wings by The Smashing Pumpkins was filmed in Simi Valley.
 In the 1995 film "Species", the character, Dr. Laura Baker, is said to be from Simi Valley.
 In the 2001 comedy Joe Dirt, the character found his long-lost parents in a trailer home park in Simi Valley (On another version of the movie, it was changed to Yucca Valley, California).
 The 1992 children's comedy Honey, I Blew Up the Kid was filmed in and around 676 Coldbrook Pl.
 In the 1992 film Forever Young starring Mel Gibson the test airstrip scenes and the highway chase scene were filmed on the west end of Simi Valley bordering Moorpark.
 Most of the 2003 film adaptation of The Cat in the Hat, starring Mike Myers and Dakota Fanning, was filmed in Simi Valley.  The elaborate faux suburb where most of the film takes place was built on vacant land in a hilly area in West Simi Valley.
 Parts of Viva Rock Vegas, the sequel to the original Flintstones movie, was filmed at Rocky Peak.
 The video for "Hexagram," by The Deftones was filmed with fans watching the band play the song in an indoor skatepark in Simi Valley.
 The 2003 video game Black & Bruised has a character, Jumping Janet, whose hometown is Simi Valley.
 The skatepark in the 2005 movie Bad News Bears is in Simi Valley.
 In 2005, the PBS children's television series Postcards from Buster featured skateboard culture; interviewing local children and visiting the indoor skateboard park, Skatelab.
 The "Retail Rodeo" scenes from the Jennifer Aniston movie The Good Girl were filmed in the Ralph's shopping center on L.A. Ave. The set was constructed inside a vacant retail space.
 Nu-metal band Limp Bizkit filmed the music video for the single "Break Stuff" at Skatelab, a skate park in Simi Valley.
 The 2006 comedy The Benchwarmers was filmed on location in Knolls park and Santa Susana Park, both located in Simi Valley.
 In March 2008, G.I. Joe: The Rise of Cobra started filming in the northern hills above Simi Valley, near the Little House on the Prairie site.
 The Patrick Swayze movie Three Wishes used a baseball field in Simi Valley, near the Santa Susana Pass.
 In 2009, the rock band AFI filmed their music video for Beautiful Thieves, the second single from their album Crash Love, in a mansion in Simi Valley.
 The 2009 Hallmark Channel movie Always and Forever was filmed in various locations throughout Simi Valley and Moorpark, California.
 In 2009 Gavin Rossdale filmed part of his music video "Forever May You Run" in an office building on 555 E. Easy Street in Simi Valley.
 The fictional "Atmospheric Research Institute" from the 2009 NBC TV miniseries The Storm was filmed in an office building on 555 E. Easy Street in Simi Valley.
 1000 Ways to Die uses the fictional "Simi Valley U" for most college-related clips like "Washed and Fried", "Beer Bashed", and "Who Fart-Dead"
 G4's American Ninja Warrior competitions hold their "boot camp" in the mountains of Simi Valley.
 In 2011, WWE Tough Enough chose Hummingbird Ranch, located at the north-end of Kuehner Drive in Simi Valley.
 In 2013, Bunim/Murray Productions used one of the two Simi Valley mansions to film a spin-off for The Bad Girls Club.
 Scenes in Criminal Minds were filmed in various places in Simi Valley, Including an intersection on Cochran St.
 The 2016 film Miss Stevens, starring actors such as Timotheé Chalamet and Lily Rabe, was filmed throughout the city, with specific locations such as The Grand Vista Hotel, Beeps Diner and the Mobil Gas Station off of Kuehner Drive.
 In an October 2018 episode of podcast Comedy Bang Bang, Thomas Middleditch plays character Brody Broderson, who hails from the city.
 Jimmy Tatro's popular YouTube and Facebook television series The Real Bros of Simi Valley takes place in and around the city.
 In 2019, scenes from  Once Upon a Time in Hollywood was filmed in Corriganville Movie Ranch.
 In June 2020, the Judge Cuts phase of America's Got Talent Season 15 were filmed at a currently-undisclosed outdoor venue in the city to comply with the COVID-2019 social restrictions; notably social distancing.
 In March 2021, Justin Bieber - Holy (Official Live Performance) was filmed at Corriganville Movie Ranch. 
 In May 2021, The Weeknd - Save Your Tears (Live at The BRIT Awards 2021) was filmed at Corriganville Movie Ranch.
 The main village featured in the series Father Murphy was located at Big Sky Movie Ranch.
 The 2022 film Everything Everywhere All at Once'' is set in Simi Valley, with multiple scenes filmed in the city.

Notable people

Briana Banks, pornographic actress and model
Dallas Braden, Major League Baseball player
Francis Chan, Pastor, author, speaker 
Jim Cherry, musician, singer, songwriter
Jason Dolley, actor
Aron Eisenberg, actor and filmmaker
Jenna Leigh Green (born Jennifer Greenberg), actress
Heather Halley, actress
Joey King and Hunter King, actresses
Don MacLean, UCLA and National Basketball Association player
Matt Magill, Major League Baseball player
Merrell Twins, YouTubers, actresses and musicians
Ray Navarro (1964–1990), artist, filmmaker, and HIV/AIDS activist
Ben Orloff, Major League Baseball player
Scott Radinsky, Major League Baseball player, coach, and singer
Scott Rice, Major League Baseball player
Danielle Savre, actress and singer
Robert Smith, professional bowler
Jeff Weaver, Major League Baseball player
Jered Weaver, Major League Baseball player
Matthew Wolff, professional golfer
Shailene Woodley, actress
Mike Mo Capaldi, professional skateboarder, entrepreneur
Torey Pudwill, professional skateboarder, entrepreneur

See also
Santa Susana, CA
Burro Flats Painted Cave
History of California before 1900
List of Registered Historic Places in Ventura County, California
Ranchos of California
Santa Susana Pass

References

External links

 
 City Of Simi Valley other website
 Simi Valley Historical Society
Rancho Simi Recreation and Park District http://www.rsrpd.org

 
Cities in Ventura County, California
Incorporated cities and towns in California
1969 establishments in California
Populated places established in 1969